The 1970 Delaware Fightin' Blue Hens football team was an American football team that represented the University of Delaware as an independent during the 1970 NCAA College Division football season. 

In its fifth season under head coach Tubby Raymond, the team compiled a 9–2 record, won the Lambert Cup Eastern small college championship, defeated  in the Boardwalk Bowl, and outscored all opponents by a total of 403 to 207. Roy Holcomb was the team captain. 

Following the decision by the Middle Atlantic Conference to end football competition in its University Division, the Blue Hens competed as a football independent in 1970, though five of the former league rivals (Bucknell, Delaware, Gettysburg, Lafayette and Lehigh) continued to play an informal round-robin called the "Middle Five". 

Guard Conway Haymon received first-team honors on the 1970 Little All-America college football team, and running back Chuck Hall received second-team honors.

The team played its home games at Delaware Stadium in Newark, Delaware.

Schedule

References

Delaware
Delaware Fightin' Blue Hens football seasons
Delaware Fightin' Blue Hens football